Camille Fronk Olson is a retired professor and former chair of Brigham Young University's (BYU) Department of Ancient Scripture in Religious Education and a scholar who has written multiple books on the role of women in the scriptures. She has also spoken widely in various forums on Latter-day Saint beliefs, especially as they relate to women.

Biography
Olson was born and raised in the area of Tremonton, Utah. She served a mission for the Church of Jesus Christ of Latter-day Saints in the France Toulouse Mission of southern France. She has a bachelor's degree in Education from Utah State University. She has an MA in West Asian Studies and a PhD in Sociology of the Middle East from BYU. She began her educational career as a full-time seminary teacher, at a time when few women held this position. She then was on the faculty of LDS Business College where she also served as the dean of students. She was the first woman who was a full-time member of BYU's Department of Ancient Scripture faculty. She has also served as a member of the Young Women General Board of the LDS Church and as a professor at the BYU Jerusalem Center.

She is married to Paul F. Olson, who is an ophthalmologist.

Among her works are the books Women of the Old Testament, Women of the New Testament (published 2014), Too Much to Carry Alone, Mary, the Mother of Jesus, Mary, Martha and Me: Seeking the One Thing That is Needful, Giver of Life: Lessons From Eve, Taking the Great Commission Seriously, Becoming Perfect in Christ, Be Of Good Cheer, and In the Hands of the Potter. She co-authored with Robert L. Millet, Brent L. Top and Andrew C. Skinner LDS Belief: A Doctrinal Reference. She also co-authored  With Healing In His Wings with Thomas A. Wayment. Also with Wayment as well as Brian M. Hauglid she co-edited The Fullness of the Gospel: Foundational Teachings from the Book of Mormon. She is also one of the contributors to Do Not Attempt in Heels: Mission Stories and Advice From Women Who Have Been There. She has also been a contributing scholar to some BYUtv productions. She also wrote an article in the Journal of Book of Mormon Studies Entitled Deseret Epiphany: Sariah and the women of 1st Nephi.

She also coauthored with Ray L. Huntongton and Bruce A. Chadwick a paper on educational trends in Palestine.

References

External links
BYU bio of Olson
Deseret Book entry on Olson
Mormon Scholars Testify entry on Olson
Amazon.com entry on Olson
transcript of Mormon Identity program that interviewed her as an expert
SquareTwo bio of Olson
article with mention of Olson's appointment as Department Chair
Evangelical Interfaith Dialogue bio of Olson
article on illustrations in one of Olson's books
Review of Women of the Old Testament
Book review of Mary, Martha and Me
Multi-book review that includes Women of the Old Testament
Church News article mentioning Olson giving a keynote address
Southern Virginia University speakers list
Deseret News review of Women of the New Testament

Living people
American Latter Day Saint leaders
Female Mormon missionaries
American Mormon missionaries in France
Utah State University alumni
American women academics
Brigham Young University faculty
American Latter Day Saint writers
Ensign College faculty
Brigham Young University alumni
20th-century Mormon missionaries
American expatriates in Israel
Latter Day Saints from Utah
People from Tremonton, Utah
American women non-fiction writers
Year of birth missing (living people)